Francesco Girardi (born 1 November 1966) is an Italian equestrian. He competed at the 1988 Summer Olympics and the 1992 Summer Olympics.

References

External links
 

1966 births
Living people
Italian male equestrians
Olympic equestrians of Italy
Equestrians at the 1988 Summer Olympics
Equestrians at the 1992 Summer Olympics
Sportspeople from Rome